Kim ji-yoo (born 14 July 1999) is a South Korean short track speed skater.

She participated at the 2019 World Short Track Speed Skating Championships, winning a medal.

References

External links

1999 births
Living people
South Korean female short track speed skaters
Speed skaters from Seoul
Four Continents Short Track Speed Skating Championships medalists
World Short Track Speed Skating Championships medalists
Short track speed skaters at the 2016 Winter Youth Olympics
Youth Olympic gold medalists for South Korea
21st-century South Korean women
Asian Games gold medalists for South Korea
Asian Games medalists in short track speed skating
Medalists at the 2017 Asian Winter Games
Short track speed skaters at the 2017 Asian Winter Games